Nadsiansky Regional Landscape Park is a protected area in Ukraine. The park is part of the International Biosphere Reserve in the Eastern Carpathians.

See also
Protected areas of Ukraine

References

Protected areas of Ukraine
Parks in Ukraine
Biosphere reserves of Ukraine